Afrocalathea is a genus of plants native to Africa. It contains only one species: Afrocalathea rhizantha (K.Schum.) K.Schum, known from Nigeria, Cameroon, Gabon, Cabinda, and Congo-Brazzaville.

References

External links
 

Marantaceae
Monotypic Zingiberales genera
Flora of West-Central Tropical Africa